HLA-B77 (B77) is an HLA-B serotype. The serotype identifies certain B*15 gene-allele protein products of HLA-B.

B77 is a split antigen of the broad antigen B15.

Serotype

Alleles

References

7